Jadon Haselwood (born April 15, 2001) is an American football wide receiver for the Arkansas Razorbacks. He previously played for the Oklahoma Sooners.

High school career
Haselwood attended Cedar Grove High School in Ellenwood, Georgia. As a senior he had 53 receptions for 1,032 yards and 11 touchdowns. He played in the 2019 All-American Bowl. A five-star recruit and the number one ranked receiver in his class, Haselwood originally committed to the University of Georgia to play college football before switching to the University of Oklahoma.

College career
Haselwood played at Oklahoma from 2019 to 2021. As a true freshman in 2019, he played in 13 games and had 19 receptions for 272 yards and a touchdown. He missed the first six games of his sophomore year in 2020. He finished the season with four receptions for 65 yards over three games. As a junior in 2021, Haselwood played in 12 games and led the team with 39 receptions for  399 yards and six touchdowns.

After the 2021 season, Haselwood transferred to the University of Arkansas.

Parents
Jadon Haselwood's father is Jeremy Haselwood.

References

External links
Arkansas Razorbacks bio

2001 births
Living people
Players of American football from Georgia (U.S. state)
American football wide receivers
Oklahoma Sooners football players
Arkansas Razorbacks football players